Aivaras is a Lithuanian masculine given name and may refer to:
Aivaras Abromavičius (born 1976), Lithuanian-born Ukrainian businessman and investment banker 
Aivaras Balžekas (1982—2005), Lithuanian tennis player 
Aivaras Baranauskas (born 1980), Lithuanian professional track cyclist and Olympic competitor
Aivaras Bendžius (born 1993), Lithuanian hockey player
Aivaras Laurišas (born 1977), Lithuanian footballer
Aivaras Stepukonis (born 1972), Lithuanian singer-songwriter, musician and philosopher

References

Lithuanian masculine given names